Robert Adriaan van der Horst (born 17 October 1984) is a Dutch former field hockey player who played as a defender and currently the assistant coach of the first men's team of Oranje-Rood.

He played a total of 272 caps for the Dutch national team, which makes him the seventh most capped Dutch player of all time. He scored 14 goals in his international career which lasted from 2004 until 2016. The defender was the captain of the national teams that finished fourth at the 2008 and 2016 Olympics and won a silver medal in 2012. He played club hockey for Oranje Zwart, Rotterdam and Oranje-Rood.

Club career
He played in the youth ranks of Oranje Zwart for two years before he got into the first team, in which he played for eight seasons. After those eight seasons, he joined HC Rotterdam. He wanted to leave Oranje Zwart after those eight seasons because he felt that he had so much responsibility for his team and club that it was at the expense of his own development as a hockey player. After three seasons with Rotterdam, he returned to Oranje Zwart. After Oranje Zwart merged in 2016 with EMHC he started playing for the newly formed club HC Oranje-Rood. In April 2019 van der Horst announced he would retire at the end of the season.

International career
He made his debut for the Dutch national team during the 2004 Champions Trophy in Lahore. He was named the 2005 Young Player of the Year and the 2015 Player of the Year by the International Hockey Federation, which also placed him on the 2007 All-Star team. He was selected as player of the tournament at the 2007 EuroHockey Nations Championship. During his long international career, he played in three Summer Olympics, three World Cups and six EuroHockey Championships. In 2016, the head coach of the national team announced he would no longer be called up, so the 2016 Summer Olympics was his last tournament with the national team.

Coaching career
After van der Horst announced his retirement as a player it was announced that he would become the new head coach of his former club's first men's team Oranje-Rood. After three years as the head coach, he took a step back and switched roles with the assistant coach.

Personal life
He was born and raised in Eindhoven, where he currently still lives. He is married and has two children.

Honours

Club
Oranje Zwart
 Hoofdklasse: 2004–05, 2013–14, 2014–15, 2015–16
 Euro Hockey League: 2014–15

International
Netherlands
 EuroHockey Championships: 2007, 2015
 Champions Trophy: 2006
 Hockey World League: 2012–13

Individual
 FIH WorldHockey Young Player of the Year: 2005
 FIH Player of the Year: 2015
 Best hockey player in the Netherlands: 2005, 2011, 2012

References

External links
 

1984 births
Living people
Dutch male field hockey players
Male field hockey defenders
Dutch field hockey coaches
Sportspeople from Eindhoven
Field hockey players at the 2008 Summer Olympics
2006 Men's Hockey World Cup players
Field hockey players at the 2012 Summer Olympics
2010 Men's Hockey World Cup players
2014 Men's Hockey World Cup players
Field hockey players at the 2016 Summer Olympics
Olympic field hockey players of the Netherlands
Olympic silver medalists for the Netherlands
Olympic medalists in field hockey
Medalists at the 2012 Summer Olympics
Oranje Zwart players
HC Rotterdam players
HC Oranje-Rood players
Men's Hoofdklasse Hockey players
20th-century Dutch people
21st-century Dutch people